"Always" is a song by American rock band Saliva. It was released in October 2002 as the first single off their third studio album Back into Your System (2002). The song reached number one on the Billboard Modern Rock Tracks (now called Alternative Songs) chart for one week in February 2003, making this Saliva's only number-one hit in their career. "Always" also peaked at number 51 on the Hot 100, the band's highest-charted single on that chart. It also reached the top 50 in countries like Ireland and the UK. The accompanying music video for the song, directed by Charles Infante, features a man roaming around the city being haunted by a woman.

Critical reception
Brian O'Neill of AllMusic gave the song a "Track Pick" tag, describing it as "histrionic" and encapsulating the melodrama from Kiss' Animalize.

Chart performance
"Always" reached number one on the Billboard Modern Rock Tracks (now called Alternative Songs) chart for the week of February 1, 2003, ending the nine-week reign of "All My Life" by the Foo Fighters. This remains Saliva's only number-one hit in their career. On the week of December 14, 2002, the song debuted at number 70 on the Billboard Hot 100. Ten weeks later, it reached number 51 the week of February 15, 2003. To date, it is the band's highest-charted single on that chart. The song also charted in the UK and Ireland, debuting at numbers 47 and 48 for the weeks of March 6 and 9, 2003 respectively before leaving the next week. It fared less better in Australia, only charting at number 62 on the week of March 10, 2003.

Music video
Directed by Charles Infante, the video focuses on a young man, played by Southies Own Steven Kozlowski, who appears to be haunted by a woman of his past, sporadically appearing throughout the empty city. The video ends with the man, frustrated, destroying a telephone booth before sitting on the ground, crying. MTV requested an edit of the lyrics in the final verse. The line "the pistol shaking in my hand, and all I can hear is the sound" was edited to replace the word "pistol" with "anger" in the video version.

Uses in media
"Always" was the theme song for WWE's Survivor Series Pay-per-view in November 2002. It was also featured in the music video game Guitar Hero: Warriors of Rock as a downloadable content song.

Track listing

 Always (Radio edit) bears no difference to the album version, but Always (Video) is censored; the word "pistol" is replaced with the word "anger".

Charts

See also
 List of Billboard number-one alternative singles of the 2000s

References

2003 singles
2002 songs
Saliva (band) songs
Songs about domestic violence
Song recordings produced by Bob Marlette
Songs written by Bob Marlette
Songs written by Josey Scott